American liberals are proponents of Modern liberalism in the United States. This ideology combines ideas of civil liberty and equality with support for social justice and a mixed economy. According to Ian Adams, all major American parties are "liberal and always have been. Essentially they espouse classical liberalism, that is a form of democratized Whig constitutionalism plus the free market. The point of difference comes with the influence of social liberalism".

Economically, modern liberalism opposes cuts to the social safety net and supports a role for government in reducing inequality, providing education, ensuring access to healthcare, regulating economic activity and protecting the natural environment. This form of liberalism took shape in the 20th century United States as the franchise and other civil rights were extended to a larger class of citizens. Major examples include Theodore Roosevelt's Square Deal and New Nationalism, Woodrow Wilson's New Freedom, Franklin D. Roosevelt's New Deal, Harry S. Truman's Fair Deal, John F. Kennedy's New Frontier and Lyndon B. Johnson's Great Society.

In the first half of the 20th century, both major American parties had a conservative and a liberal wing. The conservative Northern Republicans and Southern Democrats formed the conservative coalition which dominated the Congress in the pre-Civil Rights era. As the Democrats under President Johnson began to support civil rights, the formerly Solid South, meaning solidly Democratic, became solidly Republican, except in districts with a large number of African-American voters. Since the 1960s, the Democratic Party has been considered liberal and the Republican Party has been considered conservative. As a group, liberals are referred to as the left and conservatives as the right. Starting in the 21st century, there has also been a sharp division between liberals who tend to live in denser, more heterogeneous communities and conservatives who tend to live in less dense, more homogeneous communities.

Politicians
 Senator Benjamin Wade (1800-1878), Republican Senator from Ohio
 Governor John C. Frémont (1813-1890), Republican Presidential Candidate in 1856
 Representative Henry Winter Davis (1817-1865), Republican Representative from Maryland
 Secretary William Jennings Bryan (1860-1925), Democratic Presidential Candidate in 1896, 1900, and 1908.  
 President Theodore Roosevelt (1858–1919), Republican president from 1901 to 1909 and 1912 Progressive Party presidential nominee
 President Woodrow Wilson (1856–1924), Democratic president from 1913 to 1921
 Governor and Senator Robert M. La Follette from Wisconsin (1855–1925), Republican and Progressive (1924 presidential nominee)
 Senator George W. Norris (1861–1944), Republican and independent from Nebraska
 Governor and Senator Hiram Johnson (1866–1945), Republican and Progressive from California
 Senator Robert F. Wagner (1877–1953), Democrat from New York
 President Franklin D. Roosevelt (1882–1945), Democratic president from 1933 to 1945
 Mayor Fiorello H. La Guardia (1882–1947), Republican Mayor of New York City
 President Harry S. Truman (1884–1972), Democratic president from 1945 to 1953
 Vice President Henry A. Wallace (1888–1965), Democratic vice president from 1941 to 1945 and 1948 Progressive Party presidential nominee
 Harry Hopkins (1890–1946), Democratic adviser of President Franklin Roosevelt
 President Dwight D. Eisenhower (1890-1969), Republican President from 1953 to 1961
 Governor and Chief Justice Earl Warren (1891–1974), Republican from California
 Governor Adlai E. Stevenson (1900–1965), Democratic Governor of Illinois and 1952 and 1956 Democratic presidential nominee
 Mayor Richard J. Daley, Chicago (1902–1976), Democrat
 Governor Thomas E. Dewey, New York (1902-1971, Republican Presidential Candidate in 1944 and 1948. 
 Senator Ralph Yarborough, Texas (1903–1996), Democrat
 Senator Jacob K. Javits, New York (1904–1986), Republican
 President Lyndon B. Johnson (1908–1973), Democratic president from 1963 to 1969
 Vice President Nelson Rockefeller (1908–1979), Republican vice president from 1974 to 1977
 Representative Adam Clayton Powell Jr. (1908–1972), Democrat from New York
 Vice President Hubert Humphrey (1911–1978), Democratic vice president from 1965 to 1969 and 1968 Democratic presidential nominee
 Speaker Thomas "Tip" O'Neill (1912–1994), Democrat from Massachusetts
 President John F. Kennedy (1917–1963), Democratic president from 1961 to 1963
 Mayor Tom Bradley, Los Angeles (1917–1998), Democratic mayor from 1973 to 1993
 Representative Bella Abzug (1920–1998), Democrat from New York and one of the founders of the National Women's Political Caucus
 Mayor John Lindsay, New York City (1921–2000), Republican and who switched to the Democratic Party
 Senator George McGovern, South Dakota (1922–2012), 1972 Democratic presidential nominee
 President Jimmy Carter (born 1924), Democratic president from 1977 to 1981
 Senator Robert F. Kennedy (1925–1968), Democrat from New York
 Senator Daniel Patrick Moynihan (1927–2003), Democrat from New York
 Vice President Walter Mondale (1928–2021), Democratic vice president from 1977 to 1981 and 1984 Democratic presidential nominee
Supervisor and Councilman Zev Yaroslavsky (born 1948), Democrat from California, member of the Los Angeles County Board of Supervisors from 1994 to 2014, member of the Los Angeles City Council from 1975 to 1994
 Representative John Conyers (1929–2019), Democrat from Michigan
 Senator Ted Kennedy, Massachusetts (1932–2009), Democrat
 Governor Mario Cuomo, New York (1932–2015), Democrat
 Representative Barbara Jordan, Texas (1936–1996), Democrat
 Governor Jerry Brown (born 1938), Democrat from California
 Representative John Lewis (1940–2020), Democrat from Georgia
 Speaker Nancy Pelosi (born 1940), Democrat from California
 Representative Barney Frank (born 1940), Democrat from Massachusetts
 Senator Bernie Sanders (born 1941), independent, self-described democratic socialist from Vermont
 President Joe Biden (born 1942), Democratic president since 2021, Democratic vice president from 2009 to 2017, Democratic senator from Delaware
 Senator Paul Wellstone (1944–2002), Democrat from Minnesota
 Representative Dennis Kucinich (born 1946), Democrat from Ohio
 President Bill Clinton (born 1946), Democratic president from 1993 to 2001
 Secretary Hillary Clinton (born 1947), first lady from 1993 to 2001, Secretary of State from 2009 to 2013 and 2016 Democratic presidential nominee
 Governor Howard Dean (born 1948), Democrat from Vermont
 Vice President Al Gore (born 1948), Democrat from Tennessee
 Senator Elizabeth Warren (born 1949), Democrat from Massachusetts
 Senator Al Franken (born 1951), Democrat from Minnesota
 Senator Russ Feingold (born 1953), Democrat from Wisconsin
 Senator Amy Klobuchar (born 1960), Democrat from Minnesota
 President Barack Obama (born 1961), Democratic president from 2009 to 2017
 Vice President Kamala Harris (born 1964), Democrat from California
 Congressman Beto O'Rourke (born 1972), Democrat from Texas
 Mayor and Secretary Pete Buttigieg (born 1982), Democrat from Indiana

Intellectuals
 Lester Frank Ward (1841–1913), sociologist
 Thorstein Veblen (1857–1929), economist
 John Dewey (1859–1952), philosopher
 Herbert Croly (1869–1930), political scientist
 Vernon Louis Parrington (1871–1929), historian
 Charles A. Beard (1874–1948), historian
 Alvin Hansen (1887–1975), economist
 Reinhold Niebuhr (1892–1971), theologian
 Henry Steele Commager (1902–1998), historian
 Lionel Trilling (1905–1975), literary critic
 John Kenneth Galbraith (1908–2006), economist
 C. Vann Woodward (1908–1999), historian
 Alfred Kazin (1915–1998), literary critic and writer
 Richard Hofstadter (1916–1970), historian
 Eric F. Goldman (1916–1989), historian
 Arthur Schlesinger Jr. (1917–2007), historian
 John Rawls (1921–2002), philosopher
 William Appleman Williams (1921–1990), historian
 Richard Rorty (1931–2007), philosopher
 Garry Wills (born 1934), historian
 Robert Reich (born 1946), economist
 Roberto Unger (born 1947), philosopher
 Amy Gutmann (born 1949), political scientist
 Henry Louis Gates (born 1950), historian
 Paul Krugman (born 1953), economist
 Melissa Harris-Perry (born 1972), African-American scholar

Jurists and the law
 Justice John Marshall Harlan (1833-1911) 
 Justice Louis Brandeis (1856–1941)
 Chief Justice Earl Warren (1891–1974)
 Justice William O. Douglas (1898–1980)
 Justice William J. Brennan Jr. (1906–1997)
 Justice Thurgood Marshall (1908–1993)
 Judge A. Leon Higginbotham Jr. (1928–1998)
 Ronald Dworkin (1931–2013), jurisprudence
 John Hart Ely (1938–2003), jurisprudence
 Laurence Tribe (born 1941), jurisprudence
 Harold Koh (born 1954), jurisprudence
 Pamela Karlan (born 1959), jurisprudence
 Jeffrey Toobin (born 1960), lawyer, legal analyst and author

Writers, activists and commentators
 Samuel Gompers (1850–1924), labor leader, founder and first president of the American Federation of Labor
 Jane Addams (1860–1935), social worker and activist
 W.E.B. DuBois (1868–1963), Black leader
 William Monroe Trotter (1872–1934), civil rights leader and founder of the Boston Guardian
 Edith Abbott (1876–1957), economist and social worker
 Eleanor Roosevelt (1884–1962), writer, Democratic leader, First Lady from 1933 to 1945 and wife of Franklin D. Roosevelt
 A. Philip Randolph (1889–1979), notable leader in American labor movement and civil rights movement
 Rachel Carson (1907–1964), environmentalist 
 Walter Reuther (1907–1970), leader in American labor movement and civil rights movement
 Fannie Lou Hamer (1917–1977), voting and civil rights activist
 Betty Friedan (1921–2006), feminist and first president of the National Organization for Women
 Gore Vidal (1925–2012), author
 Coretta Scott King (1927–2006), Black leader
 Cesar Chávez (1927–1993), Chicano leader
 Harvey Milk (1930–1978), gay rights activist
 Betty Ford (1918–2011), First Lady from 1974 to 1977, feminist and women's rights activist
 George Soros (born 1930), financier and philanthropist
 Susan Sontag (1933–2004), writer
 Gloria Steinem (born 1934), feminist
 Bill Moyers (born 1934), journalist and political commentator
 Bill Press (born 1940), journalist and political commentator
 Jim Hightower (born 1943), columnist, author and activist
 Faye Wattleton (born 1943), feminist
 James Carville (born 1944), political commentator
 Patricia Ireland (born 1945), feminist
 Arianna Huffington (born 1950), political commentator
 Lawrence O'Donnell (born 1951), political commentator
 Michael Moore (born 1954), filmmaker
 Bill Maher (born 1956), comedian and political commentator
 Keith Olbermann (born 1959), journalist and political commentator
 Katrina vanden Heuvel (born 1959), journalist and political commentator
 Tavis Smiley (born 1964), political commentator
 Cenk Uygur (born 1970), radio host and political commentator
 Markos Moulitsas (born 1971), blogger and activist
 Rachel Maddow (born 1973), political commentator
 Stacey Abrams (born 1973), civil rights activist
 Shaun King (born 1979), civil rights activist
 Linda Sarsour (born 1980), civil rights activist
 Matthew Yglesias (born 1981), blogger and journalist
 Dena Takruri (born 1983), journalist and reporter
 Ezra Klein (born 1984), columnist and blogger
 Ana Kasparian (born 1986), political commentator

Religious leaders
 Anna Pauline Murray (1910–1985), minister, lawyer and civil rights activist
 Martin Luther King Jr. (1929–1968) minister and civil rights activist 
 Arthur Waskow (born 1933), rabbi, political activist and author
 Jesse Jackson (born 1941), minister and civil rights activist
 Michael Lerner (born 1943), rabbi and political activist
 David Saperstein (born 1947) rabbi and political activist
 Jim Wallis (born 1948), evangelical pastor, founder and editor of Sojourners
 Al Sharpton (born 1954), minister and civil rights activist
 William Barber (born 1963), minister and activist
 Lennox Yearwood (born 1969), minister and activist
 Welton Gaddy, minister, religious commentator and radio host
 Harold Schulweis (1925–2014), rabbi and author

Blogs
 AlterNet
 Daily Kos
 FireDogLake
 The Huffington Post
 Talking Points Memo
 Salon
 ThinkProgress

Magazines and publications
 The American Prospect
 The Atlantic
 Mother Jones
 The Nation
 The New Republic
 Rolling Stone
 Sojourners

Think tanks
 Center for American Progress
 Roosevelt Institute
 Center on Budget and Policy Priorities

See also 
 List of American conservatives

References 

Lists of American people
Lists of people by ideology
United States politics-related lists